Public Resources Advisory Group (PRAG) is a financial and investment advisory firm headquartered in New York City, with offices in Los Angeles, Philadelphia, St. Petersburg, Oakland, and Boston. The firm was founded in 1985 to provide in-depth support to state and local governments, authorities and agencies and other not-for-profit entities.

Thomson Reuters has ranked PRAG as one of the top three financial advisory firms in the nation over the past decade. In 2010, PRAG was the #1 financial adviser in New York State and California, by volume. Nationally in 2010, PRAG managed 172 municipal bond issues totaling over $42 billion in volume.

References

External links

Public finance